Dicranostegia is a monotypic genus of hemiparasitic flowering plants belonging to the family Orobanchaceae, containing the species Dicranostegia orcuttiana, commonly known as Orcutt's bird's beak or Baja bird's beak. It is near-endemic to Baja California, found from Miller's Landing north to Tijuana, but has a few occurrences in southern San Diego County, California. It is differentiated among other similar species (like Cordylanthus spp.) in California by its leaves with 8 to 11 lateral lobes that are paired. It was formerly placed in the genus Cordylanthus until phylogenetic analysis led to it being split off. This species is threatened by the destruction of its habitat from urbanization.

Description 
The roots are mostly yellowish in color, and form haustoria on their finer branches. The leaves are pinnately divided, arranged alternately, and are sessile.

The inflorescence is a very dense cluster of flowers (an elongated spike) surrounded by leaf-like outer bracts.

Distribution and habitat 
This species is present in both the United States and Mexico. In Mexico, it is found in the state of Baja California, from Miller's Landing in the central part of the state north to Tijuana. In the United States, this species is found in San Diego County, California, where it occurs in the southern part of the county, in the Otay River valley, the Tijuana Hills, and the Tijuana River valley. It was once present further north in San Diego County, notably in Rice Canyon and Greg Rogers Park in Chula Vista, but these occurrences have been extirpated to make way for residential development. In California, this species has a state rank of S1 (Critically Imperiled), and a CNPS Rare Plant Inventory rank of 2B.1 (Seriously threatened in California but common elsewhere).

This species is most often found growing in a riparian habitat. In the Tijuana River valley, it can be found in a cobbly ecotone with coastal sage scrub above with Baccharis thickets and southern willow scrub (Salix lasiolepis and associates) near the water. The former occurrence in Chula Vista at Greg Rogers Park has a substrate of Reiff fine sandy loam. In the Otay River area, this species is found on Holocene alluviums and riverwash.

Gallery

References

External links 
 Jepson Manual Treatment
 USDA Plants Profile
 San Diego Rare Plant Monitoring Report
 Photo gallery

Orobanchaceae
Orobanchaceae genera
Flora of Baja California
Flora of California
Parasitic plants
Critically endangered flora of California
Monotypic Lamiales genera